Pejman "Pej" Vahdat is an American actor known for his role of Arastoo Vaziri in Bones from 2009 to 2017. In 2022, Vahdat was cast as Dex Dexter for the fifth season of the CW reboot series Dynasty.

Career 
Before his acting career he attended San Diego State University, where he was a member of the San Diego State Aztecs men's tennis team. He also played Kash during the first season of the Showtime series Shameless.

In 2018, he appeared in the Farmers Insurance Group commercial "Parking Splat."

Filmography

Films

Television

References

External links
 
 

American people of Iranian descent
Living people
American male television actors
Year of birth missing (living people)
Male actors from San Jose, California
American Muslims